Teluknaga is a district in the province of Banten, Java, Indonesia. Great Village is in this district. It has many unique Teluknaga. Desa. The majority Muslim community in this village lives peacefully with others.

Demographics 
Its population was 138,330 as of the 2010 Census. The majority Muslim community in this village lives peacefully with lainnya.

Geography 
Great Village is in this district. It has many unique Teluknaga Desa. The village's main street is Jalan KH Mushonif.

History 

The subdistrict of Tanjung Burung in Teluknaga formed part of the particuliere landerij, or private domain, of Tandjoeng Boeroeng. It belonged to Tan Eng Goan, 1st Majoor der Chinezen of Batavia.

Culture 
Masjid Al Makmur is the village's oldest mosque. Village elders named KH Mushonif very influential on the existence and fame of this village. He is a follower of Pejuang. Tak tekun.

Transport

Several taxi companies operate in the district and city.

Teluknaga is adjacent to Soekarno–Hatta International Airport

References

Tangerang Regency
Districts of Banten
Populated places in Banten